Shartlesville is a census-designated place in Upper Bern Township, Berks County, Pennsylvania, United  States. As of the 2010 census, the population was 455 residents.

Shartlesville, founded in 1765, was named for the Shartle family of farmers and innkeepers, and particularly for Peter Shartle, a pioneer settler and colonel during the Revolutionary War.

It is located just south of Interstate 78 on the south side of Blue Mountain. It is drained by Wolf Creek south into the Northkill Creek, a tributary of the Tulpehocken Creek.  The village has a box post office with the ZIP code of 19554, but outlying areas have the Bernville ZIP code of 19506 or the Hamburg ZIP code of 19526. It is served by the Hamburg Area School District.

The community was also the home of Roadside America, a large community of miniature trains and villages, located off Interstate 78, that was open to the public at that location from 1953 until 2020, when the attraction was closed, largely due to the COVID-19 pandemic. Just to the north of Shartlesville was located the Mountain Springs Arena, which hosted events including rodeos, concerts, horse shows, demolition derbies, tractor pulls, and an annual country fair.

It is home to the Shartlesville Hotel, which suffered major roof damage in February 2009 during a wind storm, which also knocked down a billboard in Reading and blew off roof tiles of the Pagoda in eastern Reading.

See also

References

Gallery

Populated places in Berks County, Pennsylvania